Marcelino Valentín Gamazo (1879–1936) was a Spanish lawyer, Secretary of the Bar Association of Madrid on three occasions, Dean of the lawyers of the State and the 64th Attorney General of Spain (Nov–Dec, 1935). He was born in Rubielos Altos on August 14, 1879 and died in El Cerrajón on August 6, 1936. He tried unsuccessfully to condemn the socialist leader, Francisco Largo Caballero, as head of the 1934 Revolution. He was murdered at the beginning of the Civil War.

Career
Gamazo was appointed by Niceto Alcalá Zamora as Attorney General of the Republic on Saturday November 16, 1935, proposed by the Ministry of Justice. He took office on Tuesday 19 November.

His most notable case was the charge undertaken by the Supreme Court against the socialist leader Francisco Largo Caballero, charging him with heading the 1934 Revolution, and accusing him of military rebellion, a crime punishable with thirty years' imprisonment. Largo Caballero having been acquitted, Gamazo tendered his resignation on Wednesday 18 December of that year, which was accepted on the 24th.

He was arrested and beaten by a Popular Front militia group on 5 August 1936 and killed that night with three of his sons, also lawyers: Jose Antonio, Javier and Luis, 21, 20 and 17 years respectively.

A devout Christian, he was a member of the Catholic Action and of the Knights of the Pilar, and participated in the reorganization of the Congregation of St. Ivo, the patron saint of lawyers.

Marriage and children
Gamazo married Narcisa Fernández y Navarro de los Paños, with whom he had nine children: María de las Mercedes, José Antonio, Francisco Javier, Luis Gonzaga, Emilia, Fernando María, Alfonso, Maria Teresa and Maria Julia.

References

20th-century Spanish lawyers
People killed by the Second Spanish Republic
1879 births
1936 deaths
People from the Province of Cuenca
Executed Spanish people
Attorneys general of Spain
Prosecutors general of Spain